Cecilia Mary Caddell (1814 – 1877) was an Irish author. Born in Harbourstown to Richard (1780-1856) and Paulina O'Ferral Caddell (†1856). Her mother is the daughter of Thomas Arthur, the second Viscount Southwell of Limerick. Her brother, Robert Cadell, was the High Sheriff of Meath.

Her works were concentrated in Catholic literature. She was a contributor to Catholic periodicals such as The Lamp and The Irish Monthly Magazine. The Catholic Union and Times wrote that her works served to "elevate the tone of the reading Catholic public". Her most popular work is Blind Agnes, or, Little spouse of the blessed sacrament (1856), which was translated into Italian, French, and republished multiple times. Cadell also wrote historical fiction, such as her three-volume novel Wild Times, a tale of the days of Queen Elizabeth (1865) and Nellie Netterville, or, One of the transplanted (1867). She also published religious biographies and religious hymns.

She is commonly described as a "lifelong invalid" and suffered from a lifelong chronic illness. Despite this, Cadell likely travelled abroad, having described visits to Lourdes and Aix in her work.

Cadell never married. She died in Harbourstown, County Meath, on September 11, 1877 and her funeral was attended by Edward Preston, 13th Viscount Gormanston and Royal Navy Admiral, Arthur Jerningham.

Works

Lost Genevieve. London: Burns, Oates & Washbourne. n.d. 
A Pearl in Dark Waters. London: Burns, Oates & Washbourne. n.d.
Father de Lisle, A Story of Tyborne. London: Burns, Oates & Washbourne. n.d.
Blanche Leslie. London: Burns, Oates & Washbourne. n.d.
Minister’s Daughter. London: Burns, Oates & Washbourne n.d..
Little Snowdrop. London: Burns, Oates & Washbourne. n.d.
Tales for the Young. London: Burns, Oates & Washbourne. n.d.

Marie, or the Workwoman of Liege. NY: Kenedy. 1856.

References

1877 deaths
Irish religious writers
1810s births